The Tennessee Volunteers football program (variously called "Tennessee", "Vols", "UT", or "Big Orange") represents the University of Tennessee (UT).

The Vols have played football for 130 seasons, starting in 1891; their combined record of 867–410–53 ranks them eleventh on the list of all-time win–loss percentage records  and by-victories list for college football programs as well as second on the all-time win/loss list of SEC programs 405-273-33 . Their all-time ranking in bowl appearances is fifth (54) and eighth in all-time bowl victories (29), most notably four Sugar Bowls, three Cotton Bowls, two Orange Bowls, a Fiesta Bowl, and a Peach Bowl. They have won 16 conference championships and claim six national titles, including two (1951, 1998) from major wire-service: AP Poll and Coaches' Poll in their history.

The Vols play at Neyland Stadium on the university's campus in Knoxville, where Tennessee has won 485 games, the highest home-field total in college football history for any school in the nation at its current home venue. Additionally, its 101,915 seat capacity makes Neyland the nation's seventh largest and third largest in the Southeastern Conference.

History

Conference affiliations
 Independent (1891–1895)
 Southern Intercollegiate Athletic Association (1896–1920)
 Southern Conference (1921–1932)
 Southeastern Conference (1933–present)

Championships

National championships
Tennessee has been selected as national championships six times from NCAA-designated major selectors, including twice (2) from major wire-services: AP Poll and Coaches Poll. Tennessee claims all six national championships.

The Associated Press (AP) has selected Tennessee as national champions twice, in 1951 and 1998. The No. 1 Vols lost in the Sugar Bowl following the 1951 season after being named AP and UPI national champions due to the polls being conducted before the bowl season prior to 1965 and 1974 respectively. The 1938 and 1950 championships, while not AP titles, were recognized by a majority and a plurality of overall selectors/polls, respectively.

Tennessee has also been awarded national championships by various notable organizations in six additional years of 1914, 1931, 1939, 1956, 1985, and 1989, though the school claims none.

Conference championships
Tennessee has won a total of 16 conference championships through the 2021 season, including 13 SEC championships.

Division championships
As winners of the Southeastern Conference's Eastern Division, Tennessee has made five appearances in the SEC Championship Game, with the most recent coming in 2007. The Vols are 2–3 in those games.

† Co-champions

Head coaches

Tennessee has had 24 head coaches since it began play during the 1891 season. Robert Neyland is the leader in seasons coached and games won, with 173 victories in 21 seasons (spread out over three stints). John Barnhill has the highest winning percentage of those who have coached more than one game, with .846. James DePree has the lowest winning percentage of those who have coached more than one game, with .306. Of the 23 different head coaches who have led the Volunteers, Neyland, Wyatt, Dickey, Majors, and Fulmer have been inducted into the College Football Hall of Fame in Atlanta.

Bowl games

This is a list of Tennessee's ten most recent bowl games.  Tennessee holds an all-time bowl game record of 29–25 through the 2021 season.

Logos and uniforms

The Volunteers began wearing orange pants in 1977 under coach Johnny Majors. His successor, Phillip Fulmer, discarded the pants upon becoming Major's full-time replacement in 1993. The orange pants were worn three times under Fulmer: in the 1999 homecoming game vs. Memphis, the 2007 SEC Championship game vs. LSU, and the 2008 season opener at UCLA. Lane Kiffin wore the orange pants full-time on the road, except for the 2009 season finale vs. Kentucky, and selected home games.

In 2009, the Volunteers wore black jerseys with orange pants on Halloween night against the South Carolina Gamecocks.
The Volunteers had originally worn black uniforms from 1911 to 1920.

On October 5, 2013, the team debuted its "Smokey Gray" uniforms in an overtime loss to the Georgia Bulldogs at Neyland Stadium.

The three new Mach Speed uniforms, which are part of a department-wide contract with Nike that was announced in 2014, introduces a taller, sleeker number font and striping that is half-checkerboard—matching the famous end-zone art at Neyland Stadium.

When Phillip Fulmer was hired as athletic director, the uniforms were changed to resemble the 1998 uniforms which the University of Tennessee won the first BCS National Championship in. This look consists of the iconic gloss white helmet with a single wide orange strip down the middle, with the orange power T logo on both sides, the updated Nike Orange and White home and away jerseys, solid white pants and white socks, and black Nike cleats. During this uniform change the checkerboard pattern was removed from the uniforms altogether and the orange pants were also removed from the uniform options as an alternative. In addition to these changes the Nike Smokey Grey alternate uniforms were removed and are not an option to be worn in the 2018 season.

The “Orange Britches” were brought back into the uniform in 2019 and worn twice.

In 2020 the double stripes on the pants was brought back for both the white and orange pants.

In 2021 Tennessee hired Danny White as athletic director and Josh Heupel as head coach. Their first change was the switching of cleat colors from black to white and wearing the orange alternate pants more.

In 2021, Tennessee wore special Dark Mode uniforms in their game against the South Carolina Gamecocks. The uniform consisted of a white helmet with an orange stripe outlined in black and the Power T outlined in Black, followed by a Black jersey with orange numbers and font, and black pants with double orange stripes

The 2022 season expanded upon the alternate uniforms, debuting two new helmets: black with orange decals and orange with white decals. The orange helmet had previously been used, but not since 1948. The black helmet was the original intent of the 2021 alternate helmet but supply chain issues prevented the helmet being fully back. With issues out of the way, it was paired with the Dark Mode uniform and worn against the Kentucky Wildcats at Neyland Stadium. The orange helmet was worn against the South Carolina Gamecocks at Williams-Brice Stadium. Also appearing in the 2022 season against in state FCS UT-Martin was the Summit Blue arm sleeves and wrist bands paired with the orange jersey and pants to commemorate the legacy of Pat Summit, who played for the UT-Martin Women’s Basketball program and is one of the most legendary Women’s Basketball Coaches of all time for the Lady Vols. 

The Smokey Grey uniforms are to be changed up over the next 3 years (2023, 2024, 2025) to commemorate other aspects of the Volunteers football program as well.

Traditions

Orange and white

The orange and white colors worn by the football team were selected by Charles Moore, a member of the very first Tennessee football team in 1891. They were from the American Daisy which grew on The Hill, the home of most of the classrooms at the university at the time (now housing most of the chemistry and physics programs et al.). Tennessee football players did not wear the color until 1922 however.

The orange color is distinct to the school, dubbed "UT Orange", and has been offered by The Home Depot for sale as a paint, licensed by the university. Home games at Neyland Stadium have been described as a "sea of Orange" due to the large number of fans wearing the school color; the moniker Big Orange, as in "Go Big Orange!", derives from the usage of UT Orange.

The color is spot color PMS 151 as described by the university.

In addition to the famous orange and white, UT also has had the little-known Smokey Gray color since the 1930s and debuted the color in the October 5, 2013, rivalry game against Georgia in an alternate jersey.

Checkerboard end zones

Tennessee first sported their famous orange and white checkerboard end zone design in 1964 under coach Dickey and remained until artificial turf was installed at Neyland Stadium in 1968. They brought the design back in 1989. The idea was inspired by the checkerboard design around the top of the clock tower at the historic Ayres Hall.

The checkerboard was bordered in orange from 1989 until natural grass replaced the artificial turf in 1994. The return of natural grass brought with it the return of the green (or grass colored) border that exists today.

Rocky Top

Rocky Top is not the official Tennessee fight song (Down the Field is the official fight song), as is widely believed, but is the most popular in use by the Pride of the Southland Marching Band. The Band began playing the fight song during the 1970s after it became popular as a Bluegrass tune by the Osborne Brothers. The fight song is widely recognized as one of the most hated by opponents in collegiate sports. The song became one of Tennessee's state songs in 1982.

Smokey

Smokey is the mascot of the University of Tennessee sports teams, both men's and women's. A Bluetick Coonhound mascot, Smokey X, leads the Vols on the field for football games. On game weekends, Smokey is cared for by the members of Alpha Gamma Rho's Alpha Kappa chapter. There is also a costumed mascot, which has won several mascot championships, at every Vols game.

Smokey was selected as the mascot for Tennessee after a student poll in 1953. A contest was held by the Pep Club that year; their desire was to select a coon hound that was native to Tennessee. At halftime of the Mississippi State game that season, several hounds were introduced for voting, all lined up on the old cheerleaders' ramp at Neyland, with each dog being introduced over the loudspeaker and the student body cheering for their favorite. The late Rev. Bill Brooks' "Blue Smokey" was the last hound announced and howled loudly when introduced. The students cheered and Smokey threw his head back and barked again. This kept going until the stadium was roaring and UT had found its mascot, Smokey. The current Smokey is Smokey X, after Smokey IX was retired at the conclusion of the 2012 season. The most successful dog has been Smokey VIII who saw a record of 91–22, two SEC titles, and the 1998 National Championship.

The Vol Walk
Head coach Johnny Majors came up with the idea for the Vol Walk after a 1988 game at Auburn when he saw the historic Tiger Walk take place. The walk became an official part of gameday in a Tennessee-Alabama match on October 20, 1990. Prior to each home game, the Vols will file out of the Neyland-Thompson Sports Complex, down past the Tennessee Volunteers Wall of Fame, and make their way down Peyton Manning Pass and onto Phillip Fulmer Way. Thousands of fans line the street to shake the players' hands as they walk into Neyland Stadium. Through rain, snow, sleet, or sunshine, the Vol faithful are always out in full force to root on the Vols as they prepare for the game. The fans are always pumped up with Rocky Top played by The Pride of the Southland Band.

The T

The "T" appears in two special places in Vol history and tradition. The "T" first appeared in 1964 when coach Doug Dickey added the familiar block letter T onto the side of the helmets; a rounded T came in 1968. Johnny Majors modified the famous orange helmet stripe to a thicker stripe in 1977.

The Vols also run through the T. This T is formed by the Pride of the Southland marching band with its base at the entrance to the Tennessee locker room in the north end zone with team personnel holding the state flag and the UT flag, Smokey running in on the field, and the entire UT team storming in to loud cheers and applause from the 100,000-plus Vols fans in Neyland. When Coach Dickey brought this unique and now-famous tradition to UT in 1965, the Vols' locker room was underneath the East stands. The Vols would run through the T and simply turn back to return to their sideline. However, beginning in 1983, the team would make the famous left turn inside the T and run toward their former bench on the east sideline when the locker room was moved from the east sideline to the north end zone. It was announced on January 24, 2010, that the Vols would switch their sideline from the east sideline to the west sideline for all home games from then on. This resulted in the Vols making a right out of the T instead of a left. This change took effect with Tennessee's first home game of the 2010 season against UT-Martin.

Vols

The Volunteers (or Vols as it is commonly shortened to) derive that nickname from the State of Tennessee's nickname. Tennessee is known as the "Volunteer State", a nickname it earned during the War of 1812, in which volunteer soldiers from Tennessee played a prominent role, especially during the Battle of New Orleans.

Vol Navy
Around 200 or more boats normally dock outside Neyland Stadium on the Tennessee River before games. The fleet was started by former Tennessee broadcaster George Mooney who docked his boat there first in 1962, as he wanted to avoid traffic around the stadium. What started as one man tying his runabout to a nearby tree and climbing through a wooded area to the stadium has grown into one of college football's unique traditions. Many fans arrive several days in advance to socialize, and the Vols have built a large walkway so fans can safely walk to and from the shoreline. UT, the University of Pittsburgh, Baylor University, and the University of Washington are the only schools with football stadiums built next to major bodies of water.

Rivalries
The Vols' three main rivalries include the Alabama Crimson Tide (Third Saturday in October), Florida Gators , and Vanderbilt Commodores. Tennessee also has a long and important rivalry with the Kentucky Wildcats. Since the formation of the SEC Eastern Division in 1992, the Vols have had an emerging rivalry with the Georgia Bulldogs. None of their games have trophies, although Kentucky–Tennessee used to battle over a trophy called the Beer Barrel from 1925 until 1999. From 1985 until 2010, Tennessee held a 26–game winning streak over Kentucky. The streak ended on November 26, 2011, when Kentucky defeated Tennessee 10–7 in Lexington. The Volunteers had important rivalries with the Georgia Tech Yellow Jackets, Auburn Tigers, and Ole Miss until Georgia Tech left the SEC and realignment forced them to drop Auburn and Ole Miss from the schedule.

Alabama

Despite the heated in-state rivalry with Auburn, former Alabama head coach Bear Bryant was more adamant about defeating his rivals to the north, the Tennessee Vols. The series is named the Third Saturday in October, the date on which the game was historically played. Despite the name, the game was played on the third Saturday just five times between 1995 and 2007. 

The first game between the two sides was played in 1901 in Birmingham, ending in a 6–6 tie. From 1902 to 1913, Alabama dominated the series, losing only once, and never allowing a touchdown by the Volunteers. Beginning in 1928, the rivalry was first played on its traditional date and began to be a challenge for the Tide as Robert Neyland began competing with Alabama for their perennial spot on top of the conference standings. 

In the 1950s, Jim Goostree, the head trainer for Alabama, began a tradition as he began handing out cigars following a victory over the Volunteers.

Between 1971 and 1981, Alabama held an 11-game winning streak over the Volunteers and, between 1986 and 1994, a nine-game unbeaten streak. However, following Alabama's streak, Tennessee responded with a seven-game winning streak from 1995 to 2001. 

On October 25, 2003, Tennessee defeated Alabama at Bryant-Denny Stadium 51-43 after 5 overtimes. Quarterback Casey Clausen scored the winning touchdown on a 1-yard sneak across the goal line. This was the most overtimes against Alabama in program history and the second most overall after a 41-38 win over the Arkansas Razorbacks football team in 6 overtimes on October 5, 2002.

Alabama won 15 consecutive games from 2007 to 2021. In 2022, Tennessee won its first game against Alabama in 16 years. Alabama is Tennessee's third most-played opponent, after Kentucky and Vanderbilt. Tennessee is Alabama's second-most played opponent after Mississippi State.

Auburn

The Tigers and Vols first met in 1900. Both teams met annually from 1956 to 1991. In 1991, the SEC split into two divisions, ending the rivalry. Both teams continue to meet occasionally, with the last meeting being November 21, 2020 (Auburn 30–17 victory). Both teams have also matched up in two SEC Championship Games, the 1997 SEC Championship Game (Tennessee 30–29 victory) and 2004 SEC Championship Game (Auburn 38–28 victory). Auburn leads the series 29–22–3 through the 2020 season.

Florida

The Gators and Vols first met on the gridiron in 1916, and have competed in the same conference since Florida joined the now-defunct Southern Intercollegiate Athletic Association in 1912. However, a true rivalry has developed only relatively recently due to infrequent match-ups in past decades; in the first 76 years (1916–1991), the two teams met just 21 times. This changed in 1992, when the Southeastern Conference (SEC) expanded to 12 universities and split into two divisions. Florida and Tennessee were both placed in the SEC's Eastern Division, and have met annually on the football field since 1992. The rivalry quickly blossomed in intensity and importance, as both squads were perennial championship contenders throughout the 1990s. The games' national implications diminished in the 2000s, as first Tennessee and then Florida suffered through sub-par seasons. However, the intensity of each meeting still remains one of the highest in college football. Tennessee defeated Florida 38-33 in the most recent game on September 24, 2022. Florida leads the series 31–21 through the 2022 season.

Georgia

The Bulldogs and Vols first met in 1899, a UT victory in Knoxville. The teams played sporadically over the next several years before playing five straight games from 1907 to 1910, four straight from 1922 to 1925, and then putting the rivalry on hiatus for more than 30 years after the 1937 game in Knoxville, a UT victory. When the two played each other in 1968 in Knoxville, the game ended in a tie (only the second tie game after the 1906 game in Athens). This game was the first game where artificial turf was installed at Neyland Stadium. The two teams continued to play each other sporadically through the 1970s and '80s, with Georgia winning four straight games from 1973 to 1988. The Volunteers won at home against the Bulldogs in 1989, a full 52 years after the '37 game. The 1989 game was the last game between the two teams before the SEC split the conference into two divisions, West and East, with South Carolina and Arkansas entering the conference in 1990, effective the 1991–92 basketball season. 

From 1992 onward, the Vols and Bulldogs have played each other every year. Tennessee ended Georgia's 5-game winning streak in 2015 with a 38–31 win over the Bulldogs in Knoxville. Tennessee brought more fireworks in the next year, beating the Bulldogs in Georgia by the score of 34–31, coming from behind to win on a hail mary pass as time expired. That play was considered one of the top plays in all of college football that year. In 2017, Georgia won 41–0 in Knoxville, resulting in Tennessee's worst home loss in 112 years. The series is led by Georgia 26–23–2 as of the 2021 season.

Georgia Tech

Georgia Tech and Tennessee have played 44 times since 1902; Tennessee has a winning record of 25–17–2. When Georgia Tech was part of the SEC, both teams met very often. When Georgia Tech left the SEC, the annual rivalry still continued until 1987. The two teams renewed their rivalry on September 4, 2017, in a game that ended in a thrilling 42-41 double overtime win by the Volunteers.

Kentucky

Tennessee and Kentucky have played each other 108 times over 114 years, with Tennessee winning 75 to 24 wins by Kentucky. Tennessee has won the most games in Lexington with 35 wins to 14 by Kentucky. Tennessee also has more wins than Kentucky in Knoxville, with 45 wins to ten. Tennessee has the most wins in the series at Stoll Field with 19 wins to 11 Kentucky wins. The series is tied at three apiece at Baldwin Park. Tennessee leads the series at Neyland Stadium with 35 wins to seven Kentucky wins. Tennessee leads the series at Commonwealth Field with 17 wins to three Kentucky wins.

Like many college football rivalries, the Tennessee-Kentucky game had its own trophy for many years: a wooden beer barrel painted half blue and half orange. The trophy was awarded to the winner of the game every year from 1925 to 1997. The Barrel was introduced in 1925 by a group of former Kentucky students who wanted to create a material sign of supremacy for the rivalry. It was rolled onto the field that year with the words "Ice Water" painted on it to avoid any outcries over a beer keg symbolizing a college rivalry. The barrel exchange ended in 1998 after two Kentucky football players died in an alcohol-related crash. 

From 1985 to 2010, UT held a 26-game winning streak over UK. In 2011, UK finally beat UT 10–7 in Lexington. Since that game, Kentucky's Football program has made tremendous strides in becoming a formidable opponent under Mark Stoops's regime. Even though the Stoops era at Kentucky is considered one of the most successful times in Kentucky football history, Stoops holds a 2-7 record vs. Tennessee.

Ole Miss

These two schools first played in 1902, with UT winning 11–10. Aside from a few sporadic hiatuses that included World War Two, UT and Ole Miss basically played each other yearly from 1927 to 1991. There are only three schools that UT has played against more than Ole Miss: Kentucky, Vanderbilt and Alabama. Like the Auburn rivalry, the SEC realignment that occurred in 1992 ended the yearly meetings. This rivalry has mostly been played in November, with only 17 of the 65 meetings between the two being played in a different month. Many times, the games have been played in Memphis, an area where both teams have significant fanbases. Typically this has happened when it has been Ole Miss' turn to host.  

The two sides have played several memorable games. The 1962 meeting, a 10–0 victory for Ole Miss, included an all-out brawl between the sides. UT captain Mike LaSorsa used a wooden umbrella in the fracas. In 1969, UT fans wore buttons to the game emblazoned with the phrase "Archie Who?" to mock Archie Manning. Ole Miss subsequently crushed the Vols 38-0 and inspired the creation of a famous song called "The Ballad of Archie Who." From 1972 to 1991, the Vols and Rebs played 20 straight times, the longest streak of consecutive years played in the series. Legendary Tennessee quarterback Peyton Manning caused an uproar in Mississippi when he chose not to follow in his Ole Miss legend father Archie Manning's footsteps, instead signing with UT out of high school. In 1996, Manning was welcomed by a raucous Ole Miss crowd in Memphis in his first game versus his father's alma mater. UT dominated the Rebels 41-3 that day. 

In 2021, the matchup featured the return of Lane Kiffin to Neyland Stadium. Kiffin, now the head coach of Ole Miss, had coached UT for one year in 2009 before infamously leaving in the middle of the night in January 2010 to become the head coach of Southern Cal. Ole Miss came out victorious by a score of 31–26. Tennessee fans caused the game to be delayed by throwing various debris including mustard bottles toward Kiffin and the Ole Miss sideline in the 4th quarter. Many fans were arrested and subsequently banned. The mustard bottle symbol became a hit with UT football, showing up all over social media and was even mentioned by Josh Heupel in a jestful warning toward Nick Saban ("..we're bringing the mustard.."). Tennessee leads the all-time series 44-20-1.

Vanderbilt

Vanderbilt and Tennessee have played 108 times since 1892; Tennessee has a winning record of 73–30–5. When the rivalry first started, Vanderbilt dominated by taking 19 of the first 24 with three ties. Vanderbilt and Tennessee played two games in 1892, both won by Vanderbilt. Tennessee's first victory over Vanderbilt was 1914 in Knoxville 16–14. From 1892 to 1927, Vanderbilt out-scored Tennessee 561–83 (23.4) to (3.4). In 1926, UT president Nathan W. Dougherty instructed newly hired coach Robert Neyland to even the score with Vanderbilt. Neyland went on to do just that, beginning an era where Tennessee became far and away the superior team. Since the 1928 season, UT has dominated the rivalry with numerous win streaks and a record of 71–10–2.

All-time record
As of the end of the 2022 season, Tennessee is ranked eleventh all-time won-lost records by percentage and tenth by victories. The all-time record is 867–410–53.  At Neyland Stadium, the Vols have a record of 478–141–17.

The UT football season records are taken from the official record books of the University Athletic Association. They have won 13 conference championships and six national titles in their history and their last national championship was in the 1998 college football season.

The Vols play at Neyland Stadium, where Tennessee has an all-time winning record of 478 games, the highest home-field total in college football history for any school in the nation at its current home venue. The stadium surrounds Shields–Watkins Field, the official name of the playing surface.

Hall of Fame
Tennessee boasts the most college football hall of famers in the SEC, seventh most in major college football, and the ninth most of all college football programs, with 24.

Players
 Gene McEver – Elected 1954 
 Beattie Feathers – Elected 1955 
 Herman Hickman – Elected 1959 
 Bobby Dodd – Elected 1959 (Player) and 1993 (Coach) 
 Bob Suffridge – Elected 1961 
 Nathan Dougherty – Elected 1967 
 George Cafego – Elected 1969 
 Bowden Wyatt – Elected 1972 (Player) and 1997 (Coach) 
 Hank Lauricella – Elected 1981 
 Doug Atkins – Elected 1985 
 Also a member of the Pro Football Hall of Fame (Elected 1975)
 Johnny Majors – Elected 1987 
 Bob Johnson – Elected 1989 
 Ed Molinski – Elected 1990 
 Steve DeLong – Elected 1993 
 John Michels – Elected 1996 
 Steve Kiner – Elected 1999 
 Reggie White – Elected 2002
 Also a member of the Pro Football Hall of Fame (Elected 2006) 
 Frank Emanuel – Elected 2004 
 Chip Kell – Elected 2006
 Peyton Manning – Elected 2017
 Also a member of the Pro Football Hall of Fame (Elected 2021)
 Eric Berry – Elected 2023

Coaches
 Robert Neyland – Elected 1956
 Bowden Wyatt – Elected 1997
 Doug Dickey – Elected 2003
 Phillip Fulmer – Elected 2012

Retired numbers

Tennessee has retired eight jersey numbers:

Notes

Individual award winners

Players
Maxwell Award
Peyton Manning – 1997 
Davey O'Brien Award
Peyton Manning – 1997 
Johnny Unitas Golden Arm Award
Peyton Manning – 1997 
Outland Trophy
Steve DeLong – 1964 
John Henderson – 2000 
Draddy Trophy
Peyton Manning – 1997 
Michael Munoz – 2004 
Jim Thorpe Award
Eric Berry – 2009
Fred Biletnikoff Award
Jalin Hyatt – 2022

Coach
The Home Depot Coach of the Year Award
Phillip Fulmer – 1998
Eddie Robinson Coach of the Year
Phillip Fulmer – 1998
Broyles Award
David Cutcliffe – 1998
American Football Coaches Association Assistant Coach of the Year
John Chavis – 2006
'Robert R. Neyland Award
Phillip Fulmer – 2009

Past and present NFL players

 Erik Ainge, quarterback for the New York Jets 
 Jason Allen, defensive back for the Miami Dolphins 
 Doug Atkins, former Defensive end for the Cleveland Browns, Chicago Bears, and New Orleans Saints 4× First-team All-Pro selection (1958, 1960, 1961, 1963), 6× Second-team All-Pro selection (1957, 1959, 1962, 1964, 1965, 1968), 8× Pro Bowl selection (1957, 1958, 1959, 1960,1961, 1962, 1963, 1965) 
 Rashad Baker, defensive back for the Philadelphia Eagles 
 Ben Bartholomew, former running back for the New England Patriots 
 Bill Bates, former defensive back for the Dallas Cowboys, Pro Bowl selection (1984)All-Pro selection (1984) 3x Super Bowl champion (1992, 1993, 1995) 
 Eric Berry, strong safety for the Kansas City Chiefs 2× Pro Bowl selection (2010, 2012) 
 Art Brandau, lineman for the Pittsburgh Steelers.
 Jonathan Brown, former DE for Green Bay Packers, Saint Louis Rams and Denver Broncos 
 John Bruhin, guard for the Tampa Bay Buccaneers
 Shawn Bryson, former running back for the Buffalo Bills and Detroit Lions 
 Kevin Burnett, linebacker for the Dallas Cowboys, San Diego Chargers, Miami Dolphins, Oakland Raiders. 
 Shane Burton, former defensive lineman for the Miami Dolphins 1996-1998, Chicago Bears 1999, New York Jets 2000–2001,  Carolina Panthers 2002–2004, Super Bowl XXXVIII Carolina Panthers vs NE Patriots Blocked FG, NFL League Leader Batted Passes 1998, 2001, NFL Leader Blocked FGs 1997, 1998, 2001, 2003
 Dale Carter, former defensive back for the Kansas City Chiefs, 4× Pro Bowl selection (1994, 1995, 1996, 1997), 2× Second-Team All-Pro selection (1995, 1996), 1992 NFL Defensive Rookie of the Year 
 Chad Clifton, offensive tackle for the Green Bay Packers, Pro Bowl selection (2007) 
 Reggie Cobb, former running back for the Tampa Bay Buccaneers, Green Bay Packers, Jacksonville Jaguars, and New York Jets 
 Britton Colquitt, punter for the Denver Broncos 
 Craig Colquitt, former punter for the Pittsburgh Steelers and Indianapolis Colts 
 Dustin Colquitt, punter for the Pittsburgh Steelers 
 Jimmy Colquitt, former punter for the Seattle Seahawks
 Antone Davis, offensive lineman for the Philadelphia Eagles and Atlanta Falcons 
 Troy Fleming, fullback for the Tennessee Titans 
 Omar Gaither, linebacker for the Atlanta Falcons 
 Scott Galyon, linebacker 
 Willie Gault, former wide receiver for the Chicago Bears, Super Bowl Champion (1985) 
 Deon Grant, defensive back for the Seattle Seahawks 
 Jabari Greer, cornerback for the New Orleans Saints, Super Bowl Champion (2009) 
 Shaun Ellis, defensive end for the New York Jets, 1× Pro Bowl selection (2003) 
 Terry Fair, former defensive back for the Detroit Lions 
 Arian Foster, running back for the Houston Texans, Undrafted 2009, 3× Pro Bowl selection (2010, 2011, 2012), 3x All-Pro selection (2010, 2011, 2012), NFL Rushing Title (2010) 
 Aubrayo Franklin, nose tackle for the Indianapolis Colts 
 Charlie Garner, former running back for the Philadelphia Eagles, San Francisco 49ers, Oakland Raiders, and Tampa Bay Buccaneers 1× Pro Bowl selection (2000) 
 Glenn Glass, defensive back for the Pittsburgh Steelers, Philadelphia Eagles, Atlanta Falcons and Denver Broncos
 Anthony Hancock, wide receiver for the Kansas City Chiefs 
 Chris Hannon, wide receiver for the Carolina Panthers 
 Parys Haralson, linebacker for the New Orleans Saints 
 Montario Hardesty, running back for the Cleveland Browns 
 Darryl Hardy, linebacker for several NFL teams
 Alvin Harper, former wide receiver for the Dallas Cowboys, 2x Super Bowl Champion (1992 1993) 
 Justin Harrell, defensive tackle for the Green Bay Packers 
 Albert Haynesworth, defensive tackle for the Tampa Bay Buccaneers, 2× All-Pro selection (2007, 2008), 2× Pro Bowl selection (2007, 2008) 
 Tracy Hayworth, linebacker for the Detroit Lions
 John Henderson, defensive tackle for the Jacksonville Jaguars, 2× Pro Bowl selection (2004, 2006), 1× All-Pro selection (2006) 
 Travis Henry, running back for the Denver Broncos, Pro Bowl selection (2002) Former running back for the Buffalo Bills 
 Anthony Herrera, guard for the Minnesota Vikings 
 Cedric Houston, running back for the New York Jets 
 Mark Jones, wide receiver for the Carolina Panthers 
 Jamal Lewis, former running back for the Baltimore Ravens and the Cleveland Browns, Super Bowl champion (XXXV), Pro Bowl selection (2003), AP NFL Offensive Player of the Year (2003), NFL 2000s All-Decade Team 
 Leonard Little, defensive end for the St. Louis Rams, Super Bowl champion (XXXIV), All-Pro selection (2003), 2x Pro Bowl selection (2003, 2006) 
 Jesse Mahelona, defensive tackle for the Jacksonville Jaguars 
 Bobby Majors, defensive back for the Cleveland Browns
 Peyton Manning, former quarterback for the Denver Broncos, Drafted 1st Overall 1998 by the Indianapolis Colts, 13× Pro Bowl selection (1999, 2000, 2002, 2003, 2004, 2005, 2006, 2007, 2008, 2009, 2010, 2012, 2013), 7× First-team All-Pro selection (2003, 2004, 2005, 2008, 2009, 2012, 2013), 3× Second-team All-Pro selection (1999, 2000, 2006), 5× AP NFL MVP (2003, 2004, 2008, 2009, 2013), 2× Super Bowl Champion (2006, 2016), NFL 2000s All-Decade Team 
 David Martin, tight end for the Miami Dolphins Former tight end for the Green Bay Packers 
 Tee Martin, former quarterback for the Oakland Raiders and Pittsburgh Steelers 
 Jerod Mayo, linebacker for the New England Patriots, Draft 10th Overall 2008 & won NFL Defensive Rookie of the Year, 1x First-team All-Pro selection (2010) 
 Turk McBride, defensive end for the Kansas City Chiefs 
 Ron McCartney, middle linebacker for the Los Angeles Rams and Atlanta Falcons.
 Jacques McClendon, offensive line for the Detroit Lions 
 Terry McDaniel, cornerback for the LA/Oakland Raiders and the Seattle Seahawks, 5x Pro Bowl Selection (1992, 1993, 1994, 1995, 1996), and 4x All-Pro selection (1992, 1993, 1994, 1995) 
 Raleigh McKenzie, former offensive guard for the Washington Redskins, All-NFL Team (1991), Super Bowl Champion (1987, 1991) 
 Robert Meachem, wide receiver for the New Orleans Saints, Super Bowl Champion 2009 
Art Mergenthal, guard for the Cleveland/Los Angeles Rams
 Marvin Mitchell, linebacker for the New Orleans Saints, Super Bowl Champion 2009 
 Denarius Moore, wide receiver for the Oakland Raiders 
 Stanley Morgan, former wide receiver for the New England Patriots, 4× Pro Bowl selection (1979, 1980, 1986, 1987) 
McDonald Oden, former tight end for the Cleveland Browns
 Eric Parker, former wide receiver for the San Diego Chargers 
 Cordarrelle Patterson, wide receiver for the Minnesota Vikings, 1× Pro Bowl selection (2013), Oakland Raiders, New England Patriots, Chicago Bears, & currently the Atlanta Falcons
 Carl Pickens, former wide receiver for the Cincinnati Bengals and Tennessee Titans, 2x Pro Bowl selection (1995, 1996), 1992 NFL Offensive Rookie of the Year 
 Peerless Price, former wide receiver for the Buffalo Bills, Atlanta Falcons, and Dallas Cowboys, Pro Bowl alternate (2002)
 Craig Puki, former linebacker for the San Francisco 49ers and St. Louis Cardinals
 Fuad Reveiz, placekicker for the Miami Dolphins, San Diego Chargers, and Minnesota Vikings 
 Jack "Hacksaw" Reynolds, linebacker for the Los Angeles Rams, 2x Pro Bowl Selection, Super Bowl Champion (1981, 1984) 
 Arron Sears, former guard for the Tampa Bay Buccaneers, 2007 NFL All-Rookie team 
 Heath Shuler, former quarterback for the Washington Redskins and New Orleans Saints 
 JT Smith, former safety for the Phoenix Cardinals 
 Donté Stallworth, wide receiver for the Cleveland Browns and former wide receiver for the New Orleans Saints, Philadelphia Eagles, and New England Patriots 
 Haskel Stanback, former running back for the Atlanta Falcons 
 Travis Stephens, former running back for the Tampa Bay Buccaneers 
 James Stewart, former running back for the Jacksonville Jaguars and Detroit Lions 
 Luke Stocker, tight end for the Tampa Bay Buccaneers 
 Bob Suffridge, guard, was drafted by the Pittsburgh Steelers and played for the Philadelphia Eagles and the Steagles 
 Trey Teague, former center for the Denver Broncos and Buffalo Bills, Super Bowl Champion (1998) 
 Raynoch Thompson, former linebacker for the Arizona Cardinals 
 Jonathan Wade, defensive back for the St. Louis Rams 
 Darwin Walker, defensive tackle for the Carolina Panthers and former Chicago Bears 
 Kelley Washington, wide receiver for the Baltimore Ravens 
 Fred Weary, guard for the Houston Texans 
 Scott Wells, center for the St. Louis Rams 
 Eric Westmoreland, former linebacker for the Jacksonville Jaguars 
 Reggie White, former defensive lineman for the Philadelphia Eagles, Green Bay Packers, and the Carolina Panthers, 13× Pro Bowl selection (1986, 1987, 1988, 1989, 1990, 1991, 1992, 1993, 1994, 1995, 1996, 1997, 1998), 10× First-Team All-Pro selection (1986, 1987, 1988, 1989, 1990, 1991, 1992, 1993, 1995, 1998), 3× Second-Team All-Pro selection (1994, 1996, 1997), Super Bowl champion (XXXI), 2× NFL Defensive Player of the Year (1987, 1998) 
 Ron Widby, former punter for the Dallas Cowboys and Green Bay Packers, 2x Pro Bowl selection (1969, 1971) 
 Billy Williams, former wide receiver for the St. Louis Rams
 Jordan Williams, former defensive end for the NY Giants
 Al Wilson, former linebacker for the Denver Broncos, 5× Pro Bowl selection (2001, 2002, 2003, 2005, 2006), 2× All-Pro selection (2005, 2006) 
 Cedrick Wilson, former wide receiver for the Pittsburgh Steelers, Super Bowl champion (XL) 
 Gibril Wilson, defensive back for the Miami Dolphins, Super Bowl champion (XLII) 
 Jason Witten, tight end for the Dallas Cowboys, 7× Pro Bowl selection (2004, 2005, 2006, 2007, 2008, 2009, 2010), All-Pro selection (2007, 2008, 2010), 2× NFL Alumni Tight End of the Year (2007, 2010)
 Derek Barnett, defensive end for the Philadelphia Eagles, Super Bowl Champion (LII), PFWA All-Rookie Team (2017)
 Alvin Kamara, running back for the New Orleans Saints, 1x Pro Bowl selection (2017), Second Team All-Pro (2017), AP NFL Offensive Rookie of the Year(2017), Pepsi NFL Rookie of the Year (2017), PFWA All-Rookie Team (2017)
 Cameron Sutton, defensive back for the Pittsburgh Steelers
 Joshua Dobbs, quarterback for the Tennessee Titans
 Trevor Daniel, punter for the Houston Texans and Tennessee Titans
 Jalen Reeves-Maybin, Linebacker for the Detroit Lions
 A. J. Johnson (linebacker), Linebacker for the Denver Broncos
 Justin Coleman, cornerback currently for the Seattle Seahawks, has played for the Minnesota Vikings, New England Patriots, Detroit Lions, and the Miami Dolphins, Super Bowl champion LI

Future opponents

Non-division opponents
Tennessee plays Alabama as a permanent non-division opponent annually and rotates around the West'' division among the other six schools.

Non-conference opponents
Announced schedules as of January 26, 2022.

References

External links

 

 
American football teams established in 1891
Volunteers
Articles containing video clips